The Women's pole vault event  at the 2011 European Athletics Indoor Championships was held on March 5–6, 2011 with the final on March 6 at 15:00.

Records

Results

Qualification
Qualification: Qualification Performance 4.55 (Q) or at least 8 best performers advanced to the final.

Final

References

Pole vault at the European Athletics Indoor Championships
2011 European Athletics Indoor Championships
2011 in women's athletics